James Bone (born 22 September 1949) is a Scottish former professional footballer, who played as a striker. Following his playing retirement he moved into coaching and has managed a number of Scottish League clubs.

Playing career

Early career
Despite attending rugby union-playing Stirling High School, Bone developed a keen interest in football, through representative games with his local boys brigade. He began his professional career with Partick Thistle, whom he joined from junior side Airth Castle Rovers in 1968 and spent four seasons with the Jags. During this time they suffered their first relegation from the First Division since season 1900-01, finishing bottom of the table in 1969–70. However, the next season Bone was an integral part of the side that won the Second Division title and instant promotion back to the top flight. He earned another, unexpected, medal in 1971–72 when Partick won the Scottish League Cup by beating the overwhelming favourites Celtic. Celtic were the reigning League champions and had been European Cup finalists only two years earlier but Bone's 37th-minute goal helped Partick to a 4–0 halftime lead, the Jags eventually winning 4–1.

Move to England
Bone moved south of the border in February 1972, joining Norwich City in a £30,000 deal. Noted for his very fast runs down the wing, he helped Norwich secure the second division championship at the end of the 1971–72 season and scored the club's first ever goal in Division One at the start of the following campaign. He joined Sheffield United for £30,000 in March 1973.

Return to Scotland
Bone made further moves to Celtic (£25,000) and Arbroath (£12,000) in 1974 and 1975 respectively. He stayed with the Red Lichties for three seasons but his consistent scoring was not enough to gain them promotion to the new Premier Division, following the league reconstruction of 1975–76.

In January 1978 Bone became one of Alex Ferguson's last signings as St Mirren manager, moving to the Paisley club for £25,000. He was appointed captain by Ferguson's successor,
Jim Clunie, and helped the side to victory in the Anglo-Scottish Cup and qualification for the UEFA Cup in the 1979–80 season. He moved to Hong Kong Rangers in 1981 and returned to Britain with Hearts in August 1983.

Bone was one of several veterans in the Hearts team and as a result the side was caustically dubbed Dad's Army. However, the recently promoted side performed above expectations, finishing fifth in the League and qualifying for European competition. Bone scored several important goals, including the winner as Hearts defeated derby rivals Hibernian at Tynecastle for the first time in ten years. The following year he notched the side's 6,000th League goal. He left to take up the role of player-manager at Arbroath in February 1985.

Managerial career 
Bone stayed with Arbroath for almost two years before moving to another former club St Mirren, as Alex Smith's assistant manager in December 1986. The side won the Scottish Cup for the first time in 28 years that season, while maintaining a safe position in the Premier Division. He left the Paisley side in April 1988 following a public dispute with striker Frank McGarvey. After a brief stint coaching with Dundee United he returned to management with First Division Airdrie, where he stayed until 1991. He spent a year in charge of Zambian side Power Dynamos FC, where he won the African Cup Winners' Cup in 1991, before returning to St Mirren as manager. In four seasons he was unable to gain promotion with the Saints and eventually resigned in 1996. He spent one season as East Fife's manager before becoming assistant to Jocky Scott at Dundee. Dundee won the First Division under them in 1998. They also secured their first Dundee derby win at Dens Park since 1989 in May 2000. In 2000, he coached South African Premier Division side Wits University F.C. now called Bidvestt Wits. Bone was appointed Stenhousemuir's manager in 2001 but again his tenure lasted only one season. He served as Alex Smith's assistant at Ross County between 2002 and 2004, before Dick Campbell made him his assistant at Partick Thistle in 2005. When Campbell was sacked in March 2007, Bone assumed the role of caretaker manager for the last two months of the season. He left Partick after their appointment of Ian McCall as manager on 25 May 2007. The following December he moved south of the border to assist fellow Scotsman Bobby Williamson at Chester City but left the position just two months later after a poor run of form.

Career statistics

International goals

Honours

Player 
Norwich City
Football League Second Division: 1971–72

Partick Thistle
Scottish Second Division: 1970–71
Scottish League Cup: 1971–72

St Mirren
Anglo-Scottish Cup: 1979–80

Manager 
Airdrieonians
Scottish First Division promotion: 1990–91

Power Dynamos
Zambia Premier League: 1991
African Cup Winners' Cup: 1991

St Mirren
Scottish Cup: 1986–87 (as assistant)

Dundee
Scottish First Division: 1997–98 (as assistant)

Individual 
St Mirren Goal of the Season: 1980–81
Norwich City FC Hall of Fame: 2003 Inductee
St Mirren FC Hall of Fame: 2017 Inductee
Arbroath FC Hall of Fame: 2019 Inductee

References

Notes

Bibliography

External links

Scotland appearances at londonhearts.com
Hearts appearances at londonhearts.com
Interview at Supporters Direct Scotland's Behind the Goals podcast

1949 births
Living people
Airdrieonians F.C. (1878) managers
Arbroath F.C. managers
Arbroath F.C. players
Celtic F.C. players
Chester City F.C. non-playing staff
East Fife F.C. managers
Expatriate footballers in Hong Kong
Expatriate soccer players in Canada
Association football forwards
Heart of Midlothian F.C. players
Hong Kong Rangers FC players
Scottish expatriate sportspeople in Hong Kong
Norwich City F.C. players
North American Soccer League (1968–1984) players
Partick Thistle F.C. managers
Partick Thistle F.C. players
Scotland international footballers
Scottish expatriate footballers
Scottish expatriate sportspeople in Canada
Scottish expatriate sportspeople in Zambia
Scottish footballers
Scottish football managers
Scottish expatriate football managers
Sheffield United F.C. players
St Mirren F.C. managers
St Mirren F.C. players
Stenhousemuir F.C. managers
English Football League players
Toronto Blizzard (1971–1984) players
People from Bridge of Allan
Scottish Football League managers
Footballers from Stirling (council area)
Scotland under-23 international footballers
Expatriate football managers in Zambia
Scottish Football League players